Central Ontario Broadcasting is a Canadian media company, which operates in Southern and Central Ontario. Founded in 1988, Central Ontario Broadcasting  independently owns and operates three radio stations: Indie88 in Toronto, and Rock 95 and 107.5 Kool FM in Barrie.

References

Radio broadcasting companies of Canada
Companies based in Barrie
Canadian companies established in 1988